Massimo Bruni Corvino (died 1522) was a Roman Catholic prelate who served as Bishop of Isernia (1510–1522).

Biography
On 30 September 1510, Massimo Bruni Corvino was appointed during the papacy of Pope Julius II as Bishop of Isernia.
He served as Bishop of Isernia until his death in 1522.

References

External links and additional sources
 (for Chronology of Bishops) 
 (for Chronology of Bishops)  

16th-century Italian Roman Catholic bishops
Bishops appointed by Pope Julius II
1510 deaths